Jezfatan-e Olya (also Romanized as Jezfaţan-e ‘Olyā) is a village in Ganjabad Rural District, Esmaili District, Anbarabad County, Kerman Province, Iran. At the 2006 census, its population was 758, in 166 families.

References 

Populated places in Anbarabad County